Ohio Valley Wrestling (OVW) is an American professional wrestling promotion and former developmental promotion based in Louisville, Kentucky. The company is currently run by Al Snow, Matt Jones and Louisville mayor Craig Greenberg.

OVW was initially a member promotion of the National Wrestling Alliance (NWA) from its inception in 1993 until 2000, when it became the primary developmental territory for the World Wrestling Federation, which is now known today as the WWE. It remained in this role from 2000 until February 7, 2008, when the promotion became unaffiliated. In November 2011, OVW became the developmental territory for Impact Wrestling (then known as Total Nonstop Action Wrestling or TNA). This relationship initially ended on November 2, 2013, but on March 19, 2019, the two promotions re-established their developmental agreement. In 2020, OVW stopped being a developmental promotion and transformed into a full-fledged TV promotion  featuring superstars such as Jessie Godderz, Mahabali Shera and current OVW National Heavyweight Champion James Storm. 

OVW's television programming originates from the Davis Arena in the Buechel neighborhood of Louisville. Their weekly series, known informally as OVW TV, currently airs locally on WBNA-21 and is streaming online via FITE TV as well as the promotion's YouTube channel. As of 2020, through various syndication and distribution deals, OVW's weekly series is available to view in over 100 million households in the U.S, and to over 700 million worldwide.

History

Founding and NWA membership (1993–2001)
OVW was founded by Nightmare Danny Davis in 1993 as a National Wrestling Alliance (NWA) member promotion under the name NWA Ohio Valley Championship Wrestling. The company primarily ran shows in the Kentucky and Indiana territories that were formerly run by the United States Wrestling Association, with weekly shows run out of the original Davis Arena in Jeffersonville, Indiana, with larger shows run out of the Louisville Gardens in Louisville, Kentucky.

In 1997, OVW ended its relationship with the NWA and renamed itself Ohio Valley Wrestling. Later that year, Trailer Park Trash became the first OVW Heavyweight Champion by defeating Vic the Bruiser.

On January 16, 1998, OVW taped the first episode of its weekly television series, emanating from the original Davis Arena in Jeffersonville, Indiana. Louisville Gardens ring announcer Dean Hill served as play by play commentator alongside Faye Davis as the Ring Announcer. The show featured an introduction to the company by owner Danny Davis, with a main event of Nick Dinsmore and Rob Conway vs Juan Hurtado and The Assassin #2.

WWF/WWE developmental territory (1999–2008)
In 1999, WWF creative team member Jim Cornette bought a stake in OVW. Cornette, taking on the role of booker and show writer while appearing in an on-camera commentator role, made his first televised appearance on July 10, 1999, and spoke of the changes that were to take place. The first group of developmental talent included future stars such as John Cena, Randy Orton, Brock Lesnar and Batista.

OVW held its final show at the original Davis Arena on August 21, 2002, headlined by a match between Damaja and Rene Dupree. On September 4, 2002, the company would debut its show at the current Davis Arena at 4400 Shepherdsville Rd in Louisville, Ky. On July 10, 2005 Jim Cornette parted ways with WWE and was relieved of his duties overseeing OVW. This resulted from an incident where Cornette reportedly slapped an OVW beginners class student Anthony Carelli for having an inappropriate reaction to being confronted by a horror-themed wrestler called The Boogeyman during a match at an OVW live show.  The two have not been on positive terms since, even having a confrontation during an event both were performing at as recently as October 2017.  Cornette was replaced by WWE Trainer Al Snow on the announce team, and Snow was replaced as creative director/producer by Paul Heyman. This arrangement would be short-lived, however, as WWE would eventually put Heyman in charge of the revival of ECW as a WWE brand. Eventually the booking duties would go to Al Snow, who would have the longest tenure outside of Cornette.  Jim Cornette sold his stake in OVW to Davis in 2007.

In 2007, WWE launched Florida Championship Wrestling (FCW) in Tampa, Florida to serve as a new developmental territory. OVW and FCW simultaneously trained WWE prospects for a brief period, but on February 7, 2008, WWE announced that it had ended its relationship with OVW, moving all contracted talent to FCW. WWE-contracted talent also made occasional appearances on OVW shows, including a match between John Cena and Lance Cade as the main event for the final Kentucky Kingdom show. However, FCW was dissolved in 2012 and was relaunched as NXT, formerly a reality/scripted television program that existed in its format from 2010 to 2012, replacing the ECW brand.

Post-WWE years (2008–2018)
In 2009, OVW alumnus John "Bradshaw" Layfield would leave WWE to sponsor OVW. On September 8, 2010, in what was dubbed the company's "season premiere", Danny Davis, who himself was making his return for the first time in over a year, announced that Jim Cornette was returning to his role as match maker of the company. Cornette, who was also executive producer of Ring of Honor's HDNet show, Ring of Honor Wrestling, announced that ROH talent were going to work in OVW, along with other new and returning OVW members of the roster.

On November 7, 2011, it was announced that OVW and Impact Wrestling (then known as TNA Wrestling), had reached an agreement for the former to become an official training and developmental territory. This agreement would end on November 2, 2013, due to a financial dispute.

Gladiator Sports Era And Al Snow Era (2018–2021)
On April 6, 2018, it was announced that professional wrestler Al Snow was purchasing the promotion from Danny Davis, who was planning to retire but didn't want to shut the company down. On September 12, 2018, it was announced that Ohio Valley Wrestling would be merging with Top Notch Boxing, a major boxing promotion in Louisville, to form the Gladiator Sports Network. OVW's first event under the Gladiator Sports banner was the 1000th episode special of its television series on October 10, 2018, from Louisville's Fourth Street Live!. This was OVW's first ever live televised event and it was streamed on FITE TV. The event featured a tournament to crown the vacant OVW championship featuring both current and past stars as well as a tribute to the companies founders.

On October 29, 2018, the brand announced an international expansion of its wrestling school and television product to the European Market labeled OVW-EU.  Most of the schools now affiliated with the OVW Brand outside the United States were formally with the "Al Snow Wrestling Academy" brand which was merged with OVW upon the purchase by Gladiator Sports.  This expands Ohio Valley Wrestling to a total of 17 wrestling schools worldwide. An on-demand service, which will air past and current editions of the original American brand plus the possibility of a future OVW UK Brand, was also announced. The service would officially launch on the third week of March 2019 at a cost of $4.99 a month.

In February 2019, OVW would announce a partnership with Impact Wrestling to produce an exclusive event for Impact's Global Wrestling Network (GWN). The event, titled Clash in the Bluegrass, would be an Impact One Night Only special held on March 2, 2019, in Davis Arena. The full-length event would stream on GWN on March 9, 2019. Clash in the Bluegrass would mark the first collaboration between OVW and Impact since 2013, and would be the first time the new Davis Arena has ever sold out an event via pre-sale tickets. On March 19, 2019, Impact announced that the company had entered a new partnership with OVW as its developmental territory.

In April 2019, local media in Louisville reported that OVW was developing a formal vocational educational program in professional wrestling through the Al Snow Wrestling Academy, and had applied for accreditation with the Kentucky Department of Education. On September 15, the school was approved by the state of Kentucky, making it the first officially accredited professional wrestling trade school.

In October 2020, OVW announced a partnership with Qatar Pro Wrestling. That same month, Game+, a Canadian channel owned by Impact's parent company, Anthem Sports & Entertainment, began syndicating OVW's television program in Canada and the United States.

2021–present
On January 5, 2021, OVW announced that Matt Jones of Kentucky Sports Radio and Craig Greenberg of 21c Museum Hotels were lead investors in a group that purchased a majority interest in the company. Snow continues to run the promotion's day-to-day operations. Later that year, Louisville TV station WDRB reported that OVW was preparing to move into a building in the city's St. Joseph neighborhood that had served as a University of Louisville employee fitness center before being closed in 2019. If zoning approval is obtained, both OVW and the Al Snow Wrestling Academy will operate out of that facility.

Current champions

Defunct championships

Roster

Men's Division talent

Women's Division talent

Announcers/Commentary

Medical Staff/Officials/Referees

Management

Notable alumni

Aaron Aguilera/Jesús
Abyss
Alicia Fox
Antonio Thomas
Ariel
Armando Estrada
Aron Stevens
Bam Neely
Batista
Beth Phoenix
Big Show
Bobby Lashley
The Boogeyman
Bradshaw
Brent Albright/Gunner Scott
Brian Pillman Jr.
Brock Lesnar
Bull Buchanan
Carlito
Chad Toland
Charlie Haas
Chris Cage
Chris Kanyon
Chris Masters
Christopher Nowinski
CM Punk
Cody Rhodes
Crash Holly
Crazzy Steve
Crimson
Cryme Tyme
Curt Hawkins/Brian Myers
Damaja/Danny Basham
Daniel Puder
Daniel Rodimer/Dan Rodman
Davey Boy Smith Jr.
Deuce 'n' Domino
Dexter Lumis
DJ Gabriel
Doug Basham
Drake Maverick
Elijah Burke/D'Angelo Dinero
EC3
Eve Torres
Faarooq
Flash Flanagan
Frankie Kazarian
Gail Kim
Gene Snitsky
The Highlanders
Jackie Gayda/Miss Jackie
Jamie Noble
Jamin Olivencia
Jay Bradley/Ryan Braddock
Jazz
Jillian Hall
Joey Mercury
John Cena
Johnny Nitro/John Morrison
Johnny Jeter
Johnny Swinger
Jon Heidenreich
K.C. James
Katie Lea
Kelly Kelly
Ken Doane/Kenny
Kenzo Suzuki
Kevin Thorn/Seven
Kid Kash
Kizarny
Kofi Kingston
Lance Cade
Lei'D Tapa
Linda Miles
Luke Gallows/Festus
Luther Reigns
Madison Rayne
Marc Copani/Muhammad Hassan
Mark Henry
Mark Jindrak
Maryse Ouellet
Matt Cappotelli
Matt Morgan
Matt Sydal
Melina Perez
Melissa Coates
Mickie James
Mike Mondo/Mikey
The Miz
Mohamad Ali Vaez
Mr. Kennedy/Mr. Anderson
Natalya
Nathan Jones
Nick Dinsmore/Eugene
Nick Mitchell/Mitch
Nidia
Nick Nemeth/Nicky/Dolph Ziggler
ODB
Orlando Jordan
Paul Burchill
Randy Orton
Ray Gordy/Jesse
Rebel
René Duprée
Rhyno
Ricky Ortiz
Rico Constantino
Roadkill
Rob Conway
Rob Terry
Rodney Mack
Romeo Roselli
Ron "H2O" Waterman
Rosa Mendes
Ruby Riott/Ruby Soho
Ryback
Santino Marella
Sean O'Haire
Serena Deeb
The Shane Twins/The Gymnini
Sharmell
Shawn Daivari
Shawn Spears
Shelton Benjamin
Simon Dean/Nova
Sojourner Bolt
Solo Darling
Steve Bradley
Sylvain Grenier
Sylvester Terkay
Taeler Hendrix
Tank Toland
Taryn Terrell
The Tate Twins
Tommy Dreamer
Trevor Murdoch
Tyson Tomko
Victoria
Vito
Vladimir Kozlov
Wade Barrett
Zack Ryder/Matt Cardona

See also
List of Ohio Valley Wrestling tournaments
Sports in Louisville, Kentucky
List of National Wrestling Alliance territories
List of independent wrestling promotions in the United States

References

External links
 
 

 
American independent professional wrestling promotions
Events in Louisville, Kentucky
Independent professional wrestling promotions based in the Southern United States
Companies based in Louisville, Kentucky
Entertainment companies established in 1997
National Wrestling Alliance members
American companies established in 1997
1997 establishments in Kentucky